Commando Training Centre Royal Marines (CTCRM) is the principal military training centre for the Royal Marines. It is situated near the villages of Lympstone and Exton, between the city of Exeter, and the town of Exmouth in Devon, England.

History
The site was established in 1940 as the "Royal Marines Depot Exton" and was renamed the "Royal Marines Depot Lympstone" later in the Second World War. In February 1960 the Commando School Royal Marines, which had been based at Bickleigh Barracks, moved to the site. The site was renamed the "Commando Training Centre Royal Marines" in 1972.

Organisation

CTCRM is under the full command of Fleet Commander and responsible for providing commando trained officers and other ranks for the front line. CTCRM is overseen by the Commandant CTCRM, a colonel, Royal Marines. CTCRM is structured with three training wings (Command Wing, Commando Training Wing and Specialist Wing) each with its own commanding officer.

Courses
Candidates who wish to become Other Ranks are required to pass Recruit Orientation Phase (ROP) for 4 weeks before beginning the mainstream 32 weeks training held at CTCRM, in addition to undergoing academic, medical and interview assessments for candidates to the British armed forces. New entry training for Royal Marines other ranks (the "commando course") is undertaken at CTCRM, at Dartmoor, and at Woodbury Common, Devon, and is conducted over thirty-two weeks. Candidates who pass the commando course receive the award of the green beret, the distinguishing mark of a commando.

Those who wish to become Royal Marine Officers must pass the Potential Officers Course (POC). This is a four-day course that assesses physical and academic ability and is very similar to the PRMC. Those who pass this and then perform well at the Admiralty Interview Board (AIB) will be given a place on the Young Officer Training course. This course lasts 15 months, of which 34 weeks are spent at CTC Lympstone and the remainder at Britannia Royal Naval College and on the West Coast of Scotland. The centre delivers new entry training to an average of 1,300  recruits a year. In addition 2,000 potential recruits and 400 potential officers attend acquaint courses.

Lympstone Commando
CTCRM is served by Lympstone Commando railway station on the "Avocet Line".

Cadets
CTCRM is the home of Lympstone Division Royal Marines Volunteer Cadet Corps which is open to boys and girls aged 9 to 16 (who can serve until aged 18) from the local south east Devon area.

References

External links
 CTCRM Lympstone Website

Royal Marines training
Organisations based in Devon
Military academies of the United Kingdom
Royal Marines bases
Training establishments of the Royal Navy
Commando training facilities
Woodbury, East Devon